Natalia Deeva (born 29 December 1979) is a Belarusian deaf female swimmer. She has competed at the Deaflympics on six occasions, the most appearances by a Deaflympic competitor representing Belarus at the Deaflympics. She is notable for breaking three deaf swimming world records in a single day at the 2007 World Deaf Swimming Championships.

Career 
Natalia made her Deaflympic debut at the age of 17 in  the 1997 Summer Deaflympics which was held in Copenhagen. Since then, she has never missed a single Deaflympic event as she further competed at the multi-sport event in 2001, 2005, 2009, 2013 and 2017. Natalia has claimed 13 medals in her Deaflympic career, including four gold medals.

Natalia was awarded the ICSD Deaf Sportswoman of the Year award in 2007 after breaking three deaf swimming world records while clinching three gold medals in a single day. However her deaf world records which were set by her in 2007 later shattered at the 2011 World Deaf Swimming Championships.

2001 Summer Deaflympics 
After making her Deaflympic debut at the 1997 Summer Deaflympics, she went onto participate at the Rome Deaflympics claiming bronze medals in the women's 100m breaststroke and women's  freestyle relay events.

2009 Summer Deaflympics 
Natalia Deeva managed to claim her first Deaflympic gold medal in the women's 50m breaststroke event. She also claimed gold medal in the women's  medley relay event.

References 

1979 births
Living people
Belarusian female breaststroke swimmers
Belarusian female freestyle swimmers
Deaf swimmers
Belarusian deaf people